High Green is the northernmost suburb of Sheffield, England, located about 8 miles from the city centre. It is found to the north of Chapeltown and is served by buses; the nearest rail station is in Chapeltown 1 mile away. The suburb falls within the West Ecclesfield ward of the city Council.
Wharncliffe Crags are nearby, as is Westwood Country Park.

High Green has 5 primary schools: 4 mainstream schools (Angram Bank Primary, High Green Primary, Greengate Lane Primary and St. Mary's Primary) and 1 non-maintained special school, Paces School formerly High Green Secondary, for both primary and secondary age children. High Green does not have a mainstream secondary school; pupils instead usually go to Ecclesfield School, approximately 2 miles away in the Ecclesfield suburb. Other secondary schools in the area are Stocksbridge or Notre Dame.

High Green is the home of Paces, a registered charity providing services for children and young people with cerebral palsy and their families, including a school.

The band Arctic Monkeys comes from High Green. Their frontman Alex Turner usually presents the band in concert saying, "We are the Arctic Monkeys from High Green, Sheffield!" Their song "Red Light Indicates Doors Are Secured" includes the lyrics, "I said, it's High Green, mate / Via Hillsborough, please!" At the end of another song, "All My Own Stunts," Matt Helders  shouts "Because I'm from High Green, I'm from High Green!" The band's drumhead features the numbers 0114, the dialing code for Sheffield.

In 2012 the organist at St. Saviour's parish church was murdered on his way to midnight communion on Christmas Eve. Two men were later convicted and jailed for the attack.

References

Suburbs of Sheffield